Martin Douglas Steele (born 30 September 1962) is a male English former middle distance runner.

Athletics career
Steele was ranked No.1 in the world at the time of the 1993 World Championships in Athletics in Stuttgart. He had won the 800m race at the Bislett Games in Oslo in 1:43.84 min. In Stuttgart, however, Steele went out before the final.

He represented England in the 800 metres event, at the 1994 Commonwealth Games in Victoria, British Columbia, Canada.

Competition record

References

 1993 Year Rankings

1962 births
Living people
English male middle-distance runners
Athletes (track and field) at the 1994 Commonwealth Games
Commonwealth Games competitors for England